Extraordinary People is a television documentary series broadcast on Channel 5 in the United Kingdom. Each programme follows the lives of people with a rare medical condition and/or unusual ability. People featured have or had rare illnesses such as rabies and eye cancer. Many of these people do activities previously thought impossible for people in their condition.

The show began airing on 28 March 2003.

List of people featured
Petero Byakatonda, a Crouzon syndrome patient
Ellie, Georgie, Holly, and Jessica Carles, the only identical quadruplets in Britain
David Fitzpatrick, fugue state (amnesia) sufferer
Jeanna Giese, the first rabies survivor, who was administered the Milwaukee protocol after being bitten by an infected bat
Abby and Brittany Hensel, dicephalic parapagus conjoined twins
Akrit Jaswal, who performed his first surgery at age seven
Dede Koswara, an Indonesian man with a form of HPV (epidermodysplasia verruciformis) which causes tree-like growths
Florence "Flo" & Katherine "Kay" Lyman, identical twin female autistic savants
Cameron Macaulay, a boy who claims to have memories of a past life on the Island of Barra, Scotland.
José Mestre, who suffered a huge, life-threatening facial tumor
John and Jeanette Murphy, an American couple who, in addition to having four children of their own, have adopted 23 with special needs
Hayley Okines, an English girl who had progeria
Derek Paravicini, a blind savant and musical prodigy
Kim Peek, a savant 
Oscar Pistorius, amputee athlete
Sarah Scantlin, who awoke and began speaking again after twenty years in a coma
Mandy Sellars, woman whose legs grew to life-threatening proportions
Shiloh Pepin, a girl who had sirenomelia or Mermaid Syndrome
Budhia Singh, an Indian boy who ran a 40-mile marathon at the age of four
Daniel Tammet, an autistic savant with synesthesia
Ben Underwood, an American man who had lost both eyes to retinal cancer, but was able to use echolocation to help him navigate the environment and use objects
Luciana Wulken, a young girl with fibrodysplasia ossificans progressiva
 Zahra Aboutalib, a woman from Morocco who lived for 46 years carrying a lithopedion after the death of an abdominal fetus
 Jane Ingram, an English woman from Suffolk who successfully gave birth to healthy triplets, one of whom had implanted in her abdomen

References

External links
Official show website

Channel 5 (British TV channel) original programming
2000s British documentary television series
2003 British television series debuts